The 2023 Tour of Oman is a road cycling stage race that took place between 11 and 15 February 2023 in Oman. The race is rated as a category 2. Pro event on the 2023 UCI ProSeries calendar, and will be the 12th edition of the Tour of Oman.

Teams 
Eight of the 18 UCI WorldTeams, seven UCI ProTeams, two UCI Continentalteams, and the Omani national team made up the 18 teams that participated in the race.

UCI WorldTeams

 
 
 
 
 
 
 
 

UCI ProTeams

 
 
 
 
 
 
 

UCI Continental Teams

 
 

National Teams

 Oman

Route

Stages

Stage 1 
11 February 2023 — Al Rustaq Fort to Oman Convention and Exhibition Centre,

Stage 2 
12 February 2023 — Sultan Qaboos University to Qurayyat,

Stage 3 
13 February 2023 — Al Khobar to Jabal Haat,

Stage 4 
14 February 2023 — Izki to Yitti Hills,

Stage 5 
15 February 2023 — Samail (Al Feyhaa Resthouse) to Jabal al Akhdhar (Green Mountain),

Classification leadership table

Classification standings

General classification

Points classification

Aggressive rider classification

Young rider classification

Team classification

References

External links 
 

2023
Tour of Oman
Tour of Oman
Tour of Oman